Overseas Chinese High School, Busan is a Republic of China (Taiwan)-oriented Chinese international school in Dong-gu, Busan. It serves junior high school and senior high school students, and was established on 1 September 1951.

References

External links

  Overseas Chinese High School, Busan

Chinese diaspora in Korea
Taiwanese international schools in South Korea
International schools in Busan
Educational institutions established in 1951
1951 establishments in South Korea